Nakkaş Sinan Bey was an Ottoman court miniature painter who lived in the 15th century. He and his student Ahmed Siblizade specialized into portrait paintings of Ottoman sultans. They made use of European techniques such as shading and perspective.

References

Miniaturists from the Ottoman Empire
15th-century artists from the Ottoman Empire